M. A. Bonnie Brown (born March 2, 1941) is a Canadian former member of Parliament for the riding of Oakville and a member of the Liberal Party of Canada. Politically she is considered to have been on the left wing of her party.

Biography
Brown was born in Toronto, Ontario, Canada. She first sought election to the House of Commons of Canada in the 1988 federal election in the Oakville—Milton riding, where she came second. At the next federal election in 1993, Brown was elected. After Oakville—Milton was divided into two ridings, Oakville and Halton, she was re-elected in Oakville in 1997, 2000, 2004, and 2006. In the 2006 election, she won by a margin of 744 votes. She lost to Conservative Party of Canada candidate Terence Young in the October 14, 2008 federal election.

Prior to entering politics full-time, Brown was employed as a social worker and teacher. She was elected as a school trustee in 1987 and was then elected to the Oakville, Ontario Town Council, and later, the Halton Regional Council. In 1993, she replaced retiring incumbent Otto Jelinek (PC) as the Member of Parliament for the riding of Oakville—Milton.

She has served as chair of the Liberal Caucus Committee on Social Policy before being elected chair of the Commons all-party Standing Committee on Health. During her time on the Commons Health Committee, she recommended that patents on human genes should not be allowed.

Brown opposed the 2003 Invasion of Iraq. She also opposed Canada's involvement in a United States-led missile defense program proposal. She was also influential in Canada's ratification of the Kyoto Accord on Climate Change.

She was involved with the Advancement of Women Halton, a group that advocates for women's issues.

References

External links
 
 How'd They Vote?: Bonnie Brown's voting history and quotes

1941 births
Women members of the House of Commons of Canada
Liberal Party of Canada MPs
Living people
Members of the House of Commons of Canada from Ontario
People from Oakville, Ontario
Politicians from Toronto
Women in Ontario politics
21st-century Canadian politicians
21st-century Canadian women politicians